Megamelanus is a genus of delphacid planthoppers in the family Delphacidae. There is at least one described species in Megamelanus, M. bicolor.

References

Further reading

 
 
 
 

Articles created by Qbugbot
Auchenorrhyncha genera
Delphacinae